"I Know You're Out There Somewhere" is a 1988 single by the English rock band the Moody Blues.  It was written by guitarist Justin Hayward, and it is the sequel to the Moody Blues' 1986 single "Your Wildest Dreams", also written by Hayward. It is the band's final Top 40 single in the United States, peaking at #30 on the Billboard Hot 100.

Background
Following its release as a single in May 1988, it was included as the opening track of the 1988 album Sur la Mer.  The single has a label time of 4:15, excising the third of the four verses and the instrumental bridge in the middle of the song, while the LP has a label time of 6:38.

According to Classic Rock History critic Brian Kachejian "The song was based on the story of a rock star longing for a past teenage love."  The Moody Blues described the song as a sequel of sorts to their earlier single "Your Wildest Dreams," with the singer looking for his lost love, although according to Kachejian many fans considered it to have a deeper spiritual theme.

Reception
Kachejian rated "I Know You're Out There Somewhere" as the Moody Blues' 9th greatest song, saying that it "presented a more beautiful melodic line, and did indeed seem more sensitive and appealing than the 'Your Wildest Dreams' recording." Classic Rock critic Malcolm Dome rated it as the Moody Blues' 2nd greatest song, saying that it's "catchy yet also calmly intricate."

Music video
The video features Janet Spencer-Turner as the character from the singer's past.  Actor Ben Daniels portrays the younger version of Justin Hayward.

Personnel
 Justin Hayward – acoustic guitar, electric guitar, vocals
 John Lodge – bass guitar, vocals
 Patrick Moraz – keyboards
 Graeme Edge – drums, percussion

Charts

Cover versions
Justin Hayward has released two cover versions as a solo artist. His 2013 album Spirits of the Western Sky has a dance version titled "Out There Somewhere", plus an extended remix by Raul Rincon. His 2014 live album Spirits Live... includes a cover with the original title.

References

External links
"I Know You're Out There Somewhere" Music Video (YouTube)

1988 singles
The Moody Blues songs
Songs written by Justin Hayward
Song recordings produced by Tony Visconti
1988 songs
Polydor Records singles
Sequel songs